Brampton Township is a civil township of Delta County in the U.S. state of Michigan.  As of the 2010 census, the township population was 1,050, down from 1,090 at the 2000 census.

Geography

Demographics
As of the census of 2000, there were 1,090 people, 430 households, and 322 families residing in the township. There were 483 housing units at an average density of 20.4 per square mile (7.9/km2). The racial makeup of the township was 96.61% White, 0.09% African American, 1.56% Native American, 0.09% Asian, 0.09% from other races, and 1.56% from two or more races. Hispanic or Latino of any race were 0.73% of the population.

There were 430 households, out of which 29.1% had children under the age of 18 living with them, 68.4% were married couples living together, 4.4% had a female householder with no husband present, and 25.1% were non-families. 21.6% of all households were made up of individuals, and 7.9% had someone living alone who was 65 years of age or older.  The average household size was 2.49 and the average family size was 2.92.

In the township the population was spread out, with 22.6% under the age of 18, 6.7% from 18 to 24, 25.8% from 25 to 44, 30.6% from 45 to 64, and 14.4% who were 65 years of age or older.  The median age was 42 years. For every 100 females, there were 100.7 males.  For every 100 females age 18 and over, there were 99.5 males.

The median income for a household in the township was $45,441, and the median income for a family was $52,614. Males had a median income of $42,500 versus $22,917 for females. The per capita income for the township was $18,893.  About 5.4% of families and 6.3% of the population were below the poverty line, including 7.9% of those under age 18 and 6.8% of those age 65 or over.

References 

Townships in Delta County, Michigan
Townships in Michigan
Michigan populated places on Lake Michigan